The Battle of Västerås was a battle in the Swedish War of Liberation that took place on Badelundaåsen, north of Västerås, Sweden on April 29, 1521. The Swedish troops, led by Gustav Vasa, defeated the Danish force, led by Didrik Slagheck, and conquered Västerås.

Gustav Vasa, who after going to Gästrikland and attempting to rally support for his rebellion, returned to Dalarna in early April and was informed of the victory in the Battle of Brunnbäck Ferry. He decided to continue onwards to Västerås. His troops had on April 23 made camp by Romfartuna Church, where the army was mustered. On April 28 they broke up and marched to Västerås, not knowing that a peasant army attempting to take the city Köping two days earlier had been defeated by the forces of Dridrik Slagheck, who had now arrived in Västerås. Gustav Vasa arrived on April 29 and began preparing a siege. They were spotted by Slagheck's troops and attacked, but managed to force the attackers into retreat.

No major victory was won and the Danish forces remained in the city for a month, making more, if failed, sorties against the besieging Swedish troops. On May 20 the Danish left the city, leaving only a small force in Västerås Castle and shipping away the other troops. The castle held out until January 30, 1522, when attempts to aid the garrison by sea from Stockholm failed.

References
 

1521 in Europe
Vasteras
Vasteras
Vasteras
1521 in Sweden
1521 in Denmark
Vasteras
Gustav I of Sweden